Britland Edge Hill is a hill,  high, in the Peak District in England.  It is located on the border of Derbyshire and West Yorkshire.

Description 
Britland Edge Hill is a prominent hill in the northern Peak District between the towns of Glossop and Holmfirth. It rises east of the A6024. To the south it descends to a prominent spur, known as Dewhill Naze, which in turn drops steeply into the valley of the Heyden Brook and Woodhead Reservoir. The hill, like most of the surrounding area is bare and open. There are no footpaths to the top, but there is a car park about 1.5 km to the north-northwest, where the A6024 crosses the adjoining ridge of Upper Heyden.

References 

Mountains and hills of the Peak District
Mountains and hills of Derbyshire
Hills of West Yorkshire